Uncothedon is a genus of moths in the family Sesiidae.

Species
Uncothedon nepalensis (Arita & Gorbunov, 1995)
Uncothedon aurifera (Hampson, 1919)
Uncothedon pentazona (Meyrick, 1918)

References

Sesiidae